Alexander Boyd, 3rd Lord Boyd (died after 1508) was a Scottish noble.

Biography
Alexander Boyd, uncle and heir, and, but for the attainder of 1649, Lord Boyd (he does not appear to have been recognised as such), being second son of Robert 1st Lord Boyd. He became head of the family on the death of his 15-year-old nephew James, 2nd Lord Boyd in 1484. He was Chamberlain of Kilmarnock before 2 August 1488 and a witness to the sasine of Queen Margaret to the Lordship of Kilmarnock on 19 April 1504. He was still living 26 June 1508. He was said to be a favourite of King James IV.

Family
Alexander Boyd married Janet, sister of Sir William and daughter of Sir Robert Colville of Ochiltree on 23 November 1505. They were related within the third and third and fourth and fourth degrees of consanguinity, and had a dispensation for the marriage already contracted between them and legitimising the children already born, 23 November 1505. Their children were:
Robert, his heir and the 4th Lord Boyd
Thomas (died 1547), ancestor of the Boyds of Pitcon
Adam  (died after 21 November 1577), ancestor of the Boyds of Penkill and Trochri
Three other sons
Margaret, wife of George Colquhoun, 3rd of Glens, by whom she had an only daughter and heiress, Margaret, who married her cousin-german, Robert Boyd, 5th Lord Boyd.
Euphemia, wife of John Logie of Logiealmond in Perthshire, by whom she had issue a daughter and heiress Margaret, who married Thomas Hay, and was mother of George Hay, 7th Earl of Erroll (d. 1573)

Notes
Footnotes

Citations

References

Attribution

1508 deaths
Year of birth unknown
15th-century Scottish peers
16th-century Scottish peers
Alexander
Lords of Parliament (pre-1707)
Lords Boyd